Kickxia is a genus of plants in the plantain family (Plantaginaceae). It includes several species known commonly as cancerworts or fluellins. Species are mostly native to Europe, Central Asia, and Africa, with two, K. elatine and K. spuria, well-established as invasive elsewhere.

Taxonomy
The genus Kickxia was named after the Belgian botanist Jean Kickx. Some species formerly placed in this genus have been reassigned to Nanorrhinum.

Species
, Plants of the World Online accepted the following Kickxia species:

Kickxia aegyptiaca (L.) Nábelek
Kickxia caucasica (Muss.Puschk. ex Spreng.) Kuprian.
Kickxia cirrhosa (L.) Fritsch
Kickxia collenetteana D.A.Sutton
Kickxia commutata (Bernh. ex Rchb.) Fritsch
Kickxia × confinis (Lacroix) Soó
Kickxia corallicola D.A.Sutton
Kickxia dentata (Vahl) D.A.Sutton
Kickxia elatine (L.) Dumort. - sharpleaf cancerwort
Kickxia elatinoides (Desf.) Rothm.
Kickxia floribunda (Boiss.) Täckh. & Boulos
Kickxia glaberrima (J.A.Schmidt) D.A.Sutton
Kickxia gombaultii (J.Thiébaut) Mouterde ex Charpin
Kickxia hartlii (Betsche) D.Heller
Kickxia lanigera (Desf.) Hand.-Mazz.
Kickxia membranacea D.A.Sutton
Kickxia papillosa R.R.Mill
Kickxia pendula (G.Kunkel) G.Kunkel
Kickxia petiolata D.A.Sutton
Kickxia pseudoscoparia V.W.Sm. & D.A.Sutton
Kickxia sabarum V.W.Sm. & D.A.Sutton
Kickxia saccata D.A.Sutton
Kickxia scalarum D.A.Sutton
Kickxia spiniflora (O.Schwartz) D.A.Sutton
Kickxia spuria (L.) Dumort. - roundleaf cancerwort

See also

Plants with common names that utilize Germanic suffix -wort

References

External links
Jepson Manual Treatment — invasive species in California.
USDA Plants Profile of Kickxia

 
Plantaginaceae genera
Flora of Europe